"Storm" is the ninth single by Japanese rock band Luna Sea, released on April 15, 1998. It was their fourth number 1 on the Oricon Singles Chart, charted for 10 weeks, and was certified Platinum in April 1998 by the RIAJ for sales over 400,000. "Storm" was the 29th best-selling single of the year with 720,370 copies sold, which makes it the band's best-selling single. It was used as the April 1998 theme song for NHK's music television show Pop Jam.

Composition
Guitarist Sugizo cited "Storm" as one of the songs he tried to replicate the "psychedelic feel of shoegaze bands" by using effects, "like playing fast with a wah-wah pedal, or using tape-echo and harmonizers. I couldn’t figure out how they did it, so I just made it into my own thing."

Track listing
All songs written and composed by Luna Sea.

"Storm" - 5:05Originally composed by J.
"" - 5:57Originally composed by Inoran.

Cover version
The song was covered by pop singer Nami Tamaki on 2007's Luna Sea Memorial Cover Album -Re:birth-.

It was also covered by Lolita23q on the compilation Crush! -90's V-Rock Best Hit Cover Songs-, which was released on January 26, 2011 and features current visual kei bands covering songs from bands that were important to the '90s visual kei movement.

References

Luna Sea songs
Oricon Weekly number-one singles
1998 singles
1998 songs
Universal Music Group singles